Papilio echerioides, the white-banded swallowtail, is a butterfly of the family Papilionidae. It is found in Sub-Saharan Africa.

The wingspan is 65–75 mm. It has two flight periods, first from January to March and second from September to November.

The larvae feed on Clausena inaequalis, Toddalia lanceolata, Toddalia asiatica, Zanthoxylum capense, Zanthoxylum delagoense, Vepris lanceolata and Citrus species.

Description

The male is very similar to Papilio cynorta, but the median band, which is very pale yellow, tapers more strongly towards the apex. The pale spot in area (cell) 6  of the forewing is always present (usually absent in P. cynorta). The female is a mimic of the butterflies Amauris echeria and Amauris albimaculata. The forewing is black with white spots, the hindwing black with a large pale ochreous discal area and white submarginal spots.

Taxonomy
Papilio echerioides is a member of the echerioides species group. This clade includes:

Papilio echerioides Trimen, 1868
Papilio fuelleborni Karsch, 1900
Papilio jacksoni Sharpe, 1891
Papilio sjoestedti Aurivillius, 1908

Subspecies
Listed alphabetically:
P. e. ambangulu Clifton & Collins, 1997  (Tanzania)
P. e. chirindanus van Son, 1956  (Mozambique (Mount Gorongosa), eastern Zimbabwe)
P. e. echerioides Trimen, 1868  (South Africa, Eswatini)
P. e. homeyeri Plötz, 1880   (Angola, Democratic Republic of the Congo, south-western Tanzania, northern Zambia)
P. e. joiceyi Gabriel, 1945    – Zoroaster swallowtail – (Sudan, Uganda, western Kenya, western Tanzania, Rwanda, Democratic Republic of the Congo)
P. e. kiellandi Clifton & Collins, 1997 (southern Kenya, northern Tanzania)
P. e. leucospilus Rothschild, 1902 .(Ethiopia: highlands south-east of Rift Valley)
P. e. nioka (Berger, 1974)  (Democratic Republic of the Congo)
P. e. nyiro Carcasson, 1962 (Kenya)
P. e. oscari Rothschild, 1902 (Ethiopia: highlands west of the Rift Valley)
P. e. pseudowertheri Kielland, 1990   (eastern and south-eastern Tanzania)
P. e. shirensis (Hancock, 1987) (Malawi)
P. e. wertheri Karsch, 1898  (eastern Kenya, eastern and northern Tanzania)
P. e. zoroastres  Druce, 1878 (Cameroon)

References

Carcasson, R.H., 1960, "The Swallowtail Butterflies of East Africa (Lepidoptera, Papilionidae)". Journal of the East Africa Natural History Society pdf Key to East Africa members of the species group, diagnostic and other notes and figures. (Permission to host granted by The East Africa Natural History Society)

Butterflies described in 1868
echerioides
Butterflies of Africa
Taxa named by Roland Trimen